Bornel is a commune in the Oise department in northern France. On 1 January 2016, the former communes Anserville and Fosseuse were merged into Bornel. Bornel—Belle-Église station has rail connections to Beauvais and Paris.

Population

See also
 Communes of the Oise department

References

Communes of Oise

Communes nouvelles of Oise